In a Euclidean space, the sum of angles of a triangle equals the straight angle (180 degrees,  radians, two right angles, or a half-turn).
A triangle has three angles, one at each vertex, bounded by a pair of adjacent sides.

It was unknown for a long time whether other geometries exist, for which this sum is different. The influence of this problem on mathematics was particularly strong during the 19th century. Ultimately, the answer was proven to be positive: in other spaces (geometries) this sum can be greater or lesser, but it then must depend on the triangle. Its difference from 180° is a case of angular defect and serves as an important distinction for geometric systems.

Cases

Euclidean geometry
In Euclidean geometry, the triangle postulate states that the sum of the angles of a triangle is two right angles. This postulate is equivalent to the parallel postulate. In the presence of the other axioms of Euclidean geometry, the following statements are equivalent:
Triangle postulate: The sum of the angles of a triangle is two right angles.
Playfair's axiom: Given a straight line and a point not on the line, exactly one straight line may be drawn through the point parallel to the given line.
Proclus' axiom: If a line intersects one of two parallel lines, it must intersect the other also.
Equidistance postulate: Parallel lines are everywhere equidistant (i.e. the distance from each point on one line to the other line is always the same.)
Triangle area property: The area of a triangle can be as large as we please.
Three points property: Three points either lie on a line or lie on a circle.
Pythagoras' theorem: In a right-angled triangle, the square of the hypotenuse equals the sum of the squares of the other two sides.

Hyperbolic geometry

The sum of the angles of a hyperbolic triangle is less than 180°. The relation between angular defect and the triangle's area was first proven by Johann Heinrich Lambert.

One can easily see how hyperbolic geometry breaks Playfair's axiom, Proclus' axiom (the parallelism, defined as non-intersection, is intransitive in an hyperbolic plane), the equidistance postulate (the points on one side of, and equidistant from, a given line do not form a line), and Pythagoras' theorem. A circle cannot have arbitrarily small curvature, so the three points property also fails.

The sum of the angles can be arbitrarily small (but positive). For an ideal triangle, a generalization of hyperbolic triangles, this sum is equal to zero.

Spherical geometry

For a spherical triangle, the sum of the angles is greater than 180° and can be up to 540°. Specifically, the sum of the angles is

180° × (1 + 4f ),

where f is the fraction of the sphere's area which is enclosed by the triangle.

Note that spherical geometry does not satisfy several of Euclid's axioms (including the parallel postulate.)

Exterior angles

Angles between adjacent sides of a triangle are referred to as interior angles in Euclidean and other geometries. Exterior angles can be also defined, and the Euclidean triangle postulate can be formulated as the exterior angle theorem. One can also consider the sum of all three exterior angles, that equals to 360° in the Euclidean case (as for any convex polygon), is less than 360° in the spherical case, and is greater than 360° in the hyperbolic case.

In differential geometry
In the differential geometry of surfaces, the question of a triangle's angular defect is understood as a special case of the Gauss-Bonnet theorem where the curvature of a closed curve is not a function, but a measure with the support in exactly three points – vertices of a triangle.

See also
 Euclid's Elements
 Foundations of geometry
 Hilbert's axioms
 Saccheri quadrilateral (considered earlier than Saccheri by Omar Khayyám)
 Lambert quadrilateral

References

Geometry
Triangle geometry